Zhang Bin (张斌, Pinyin: Zhāng Bīn; born 28 December 1961 in Jinan, Shandong) is a Chinese basketball coach and former international player who competed in the 1984 Summer Olympics and in the 1988 Summer Olympics.

References 

1961 births
Living people
Basketball players from Shandong
Chinese men's basketball players
1990 FIBA World Championship players
Olympic basketball players of China
Basketball players at the 1984 Summer Olympics
Basketball players at the 1988 Summer Olympics
Asian Games medalists in basketball
Basketball players at the 1986 Asian Games
Basketball players at the 1990 Asian Games
Asian Games gold medalists for China
Medalists at the 1986 Asian Games
Medalists at the 1990 Asian Games